Khorashad (also Romanized as Khorāshād, Kharashad, and Khorshād) is a village in Baqeran Rural District, in the Central District of Birjand County, South Khorasan Province, Iran. Khorashad is known for its beautiful nature, its notable people and its handicraft. 

Traditional drapery of Khorashad, called tobafi in local language, is one of the most important handicrafts of southern khorasan. It was registered with the registration number 1319 on 26 December 2016 as a spiritual heritage of the country. The World Crafts Council is considering registering Tobafi, which is one of the major handicraft skills and traditional arts of South Khorasan province in Iran.    

The historic name "khorashad" derives from the Pahlavi language word meaning "Sun".

It situated in the Khorashad Valley in Bagheran Mountain Range. It has cold winters and cool summers.

At the 2006 census, its population was 757, in 232 families. The people of Khorashad are Persian and local language contains many words from the ancient Sassanid and Pahlavi languages.

Khorashad is the birthplace of the notables such as: Dr. Mohammad Ismail Rezvani (A professor of History in Iran), Dr. Mohammad Reza Hafeznia (Professor of Geopolitics in Tarbiat Modarres University), Mr. Morteza Hassanpour (The first man in nursing in Iran), Dr. Ghazanfar Forouzanfar (Director of City Council of Birjand), Dr. Homayun Hadavinia (The Professor of Kingston University), Dr. M. Khorashadizadeh (Director of Birjand University of Applied Science and Technology), and more than 60 professors and physicians in universities of Iran, the United States, and England.

References

External links

 Khorashad

Populated places in Birjand County